Polk County is the name of twelve counties in the United States, all except two named after president of the United States James Knox Polk:

 Polk County, Arkansas
 Polk County, Florida 
 Polk County, Georgia 
 Polk County, Iowa 
 Polk County, Minnesota 
 Polk County, Missouri, named after Col. Ezekiel Polk who fought in the American Revolutionary War (grandfather of James K. Polk)
 Polk County, Nebraska 
 Polk County, North Carolina, named after Col. William Polk who fought in the American Revolutionary War (first cousin once-removed of James K. Polk)
 Polk County, Oregon 
 Polk County, Tennessee 
 Polk County, Texas
 Polk County, Wisconsin

Other uses
Polk County, a play by Zora Neale Hurston

See also
Polk County Courthouse (disambiguation)